Boško Šutalo (born 1 January 2000) is a Croatian professional footballer who plays as a defender for Prva HNL side Dinamo Zagreb.

Career

Osijek 
In 2015, Šutalo joined RNK Split from his starting club NK Neretva and started playing for their under-15 team.

In 2017, Šutalo joined youth team of Osijek and after a year he debuted for the first team under Zoran Zekić. He made his Prva HNL debut on 20 October 2018 in a 4–1 victory over Rudeš.

On 25 July 2019, he made his European debut in the Europa League second qualifying round against CSKA Sofia.

Atalanta 
On 30 January 2020, Šutalo joined Serie A side Atalanta for a €5 million fee. He made his debut for the club in a 2–0 win over Napoli on 2 July, coming on for Rafael Tolói in 89th minute. He earned his first start three days later in a 1–0 win over Cagliari, coming off for Tolói in 83rd minute.

On 14 January 2021, he scored his debut goal for the club, as Atalanta defeated Cagliari 3–1 in the Coppa Italia. In total, he played 14 matches in Serie A and 3 matches in the Coppa Italia.

Hellas Verona 
On 25 August 2021, Šutalo joined Serie A side Hellas Verona on loan. He made his debut two days later against Inter Milan in a 3–1 defeat. In total, he played 25 matches in Serie A and one match in the Coppa Italia.

Dinamo Zagreb 
Šutalo joined Prva HNL club Dinamo Zagreb on a permanent deal on 21 June 2022 for a term of five years.

Career statistics

Club

References

External links
 

2000 births
Living people
People from Čapljina
Croats of Bosnia and Herzegovina
Association football defenders
Croatian footballers
Croatia youth international footballers
Croatia under-21 international footballers
NK Osijek players
Atalanta B.C. players
Hellas Verona F.C. players
GNK Dinamo Zagreb players
First Football League (Croatia) players
Croatian Football League players
Serie A players
Croatian expatriate footballers
Expatriate footballers in Italy

Croatian expatriate sportspeople in Italy